Götzental Castle is a castle in the municipality of Dierikon of the Canton of Lucerne in Switzerland.  It is a Swiss heritage site of national significance.

See also
 List of castles in Switzerland

References

Cultural property of national significance in the canton of Lucerne
Castles in the canton of Lucerne